Tafnit ( Turnaround) was an Israeli political party and a social movement established by the Aluf in reserve Uzi Dayan.

History
Tafnit was established as a social movement. On 25 December 2005 Dayan announced that the movement would run in the 2006 Knesset elections as an anti-corruption party. However, the party received just 0.6% of the vote, failing to cross the 2% electoral threshold.

Tafnit merged into Likud when Dayan joined the party in mid-2008.

References

External links
Official website

2008 disestablishments in Israel
Defunct political parties in Israel
Zionist political parties in Israel
Anti-corruption parties
Political parties disestablished in 2008
Political parties with year of establishment missing